The fourth season of CSI: NY originally aired on CBS between September 2007 and May 2008. It consisted of 21 episodes, only 14 of which were completed before the Writers' Strike. Seven more episodes were made after the strike, and they began airing in April 2008. Its regular time slot continued on Wednesdays at 10pm/9c.

CSI: NY The Fourth Season was released on DVD in the U.S. on September 23, 2008.

Cast

Main cast
Gary Sinise as Mac Taylor
Melina Kanakaredes as Stella Bonasera
Carmine Giovinazzo as Danny Messer
Anna Belknap as Lindsay Monroe
Hill Harper as Sheldon Hawkes
Eddie Cahill as Don Flack

Recurring cast
Robert Joy as Sid Hammerback
A. J. Buckley as Adam Ross
Emmanuelle Vaugier as Jessica Angell
Claire Forlani as Peyton Driscoll (voice only)
Kyle Gallner as Reed Garrett

Episodes

References

External links

CSI: NY Season 4 Episode List on Internet Movie Database
CSI: NY Season 4 Episode Guide on CSI Files
CSI: New York on CBS on The Futon Critic

2007 American television seasons
2008 American television seasons
04